The grammar of the Gujarati language is the study of the word order, case marking, verb conjugation, and other morphological and syntactic structures of the Gujarati language, an Indo-Aryan language native to the Indian state of Gujarat and spoken by the Gujarati people. This page overviews the grammar of standard Gujarati, and is written in a romanization (see Gujarati script#Romanization). Hovering the mouse cursor over  forms will reveal the appropriate English translation.

Nominals

Nouns
Gujarati has three genders, two numbers, and three cases (nominative, oblique/vocative, and to a certain extent, locative). Nouns may be divided into declensional subtypes: marked nouns displaying characteristic declensional vowel terminations, and unmarked nouns which do not. These are the paradigms for the termination —

Two things must be noted about the locative case and its limited nature. First, it only exists as a case for masculines and neuters, which is why the corresponding feminine cell has been left blanked out. Rather, for marked feminine and unmarked nouns the locative is a postposition, which are explained on later in the article. Second, there is no distinction of gender.

Furthermore, there also exists in Gujarati a plural marker -ઓ (o). Unlike the English plural  it is not mandatory, and may be left unexpressed if plurality is already expressed in some other way: by explicit numbering, agreement, or the above declensional system (as is the case with nominative marked masculines and neuters). And yet despite the declensional system, ઓ (o) often gets tacked onto nominative marked masculine and neuter plurals anyway. This redundancy is called the double plural. Historically, the origin of this suffix is murky, but it is certainly morphological rather than lexical. It is new (18th century) and it is not attested in Old Gujarati, Middle Gujarati, and Old Western Rajasthani literature. It may simply be the case that it spread from an unrepresented dialect.

Thus combining both the declensional and plural suffixes, the following table outlines all possible Gujarati noun terminations —

The next table, of noun declensions, shows the above suffix paradigms in action. Words: છોકરો (chhokro) "boy", ડાઘો (ḍāgho) "stain", મહિનો (mahino) "month", કચરો (kacro) "rubbish", છોકરું (chhokrũ) "child", કારખાનું (kārkhānũ) "factory", બારણું (bārṇũ) "door", અંધારું (andhārũ) "dark", છોકરી (chhokrī) "girl", ટોપી (ṭopī) "hat", બાટલી (bāṭlī) "bottle", વીજળી (vījḷī) "electricity", વિચાર (vichār) "thought", રાજા (rājā) "king", ધોબી (dhobī) "washerman", બરફ (baraf) "ice", ઘર (ghar) "house", બહેન (bahen) "sister", મેદાન (medān) "field", પાણી (pāṇī) "water", બાબત (bābat) "matter", નિશાળ (niśāl) "school", ભાષા (bhāṣā) "language", ભક્તિ (bhakti) "devotion".

The last entry of each gender category is a mass noun.
Some count nouns are averse to taking the plural marker: bhāg "portion(s), dā̃t "tooth(/teeth)", pag "foot(/feet)", caṇā "chick peas", etc.
Regarding nouns that terminate in ī:
Rather than marking femininity, ī can sometimes denote vocation or attribute, most often in indicating (male) persons: ādmī "man" (lit. "of Ādam"), baṅgāḷī "Bengali", śāstrī "scholar" (lit. "scripture-ist"), hāthī "elephant" (lit. "hand-y"), ṭapālī "postman".
Some male relations end in āī: bhāī "brother", jamāī "daughter's husband", vevāī "child's father-in-law".
Some derive from neuter Sanskrit -iyam, -ījam, etc.: pāṇī "water", marī "black pepper", bī "seed".
Many feminine Sanskrit loanwords end in ā. i.e. bhāṣā "language", āśā "hope", icchā "intention".
Many Sanskrit loanwords orthographically end in i, though in Gujarati there is now no phonetic difference between i and ī, so those words could just as well be held as marked feminines.
In the end, unmarked nouns probably outnumber marked ones, though many marked nouns are highly frequent. Marked or not, the bases of the gender of nouns are these —
 Biological: animates. Thus a chokrī "girl" is feminine, a baḷad "bull" is masculine, etc.
 Perceived: animates. Some animals have the propensity to be addressed and cast as being of one gender over the others, across the board, regardless of the biological gender of the specific organism being referred to. Thus spiders are masculine: karoḷiyo, cats feminine: bilāṛī, and rabbits neuter: saslũ. These three can be cast into other genders if such specificity is desired, but as explained that would be deviation from the default rather than a scenario of three equally valid choices.
 Size. An object can come in differently gender-marked versions, based on size. Masculine is big, getting smaller down through neuter and then feminine; neuter can sometimes be pejorative. Hence, camco "big spoon" and camcī "small spoon", and vāṛko "big bowl" and vāṛkī "small bowl". The same can apply to animates (animals) that fall under the second rule just above. One would think saslo to be "male rabbit", but it's more so "big rabbit".
 For the rest there is no logic to gender, which must simply be memorized by the learner. irādo "intention (m)", māthũ "head (n)", and mahenat "effort (f)" are neither animates possessing biological gender nor a part of a set of differently-sized variants; their gender is essentially inexplicable.

Adjectives
Adjectives may be divided into declinable and indeclinable categories. Declinables are marked, taking the appropriate declensional termination for the noun they qualify. One difference from nouns however is that adjectives do not take the plural marker -o. Neut. nom. sg. (-ũ) is the citation form. Indeclinable adjectives are completely invariable. All adjectives can be used either attributively, predicatively, or substantively.

Examples of declinable adjectives: moṭũ "big", nānũ "small", jāṛũ "fat", sārũ "good", kāḷũ "black", ṭhaṇḍũ "cold", gā̃ṛũ "crazy".
Examples of indeclinable adjectives: kharāb "bad", sāf "clean", bhārī "heavy", sundar "beautiful", kaṭhaṇ "hard", lāl "red".

Comparatives and superlatives
Comparisons are made by using "than" (the postposition thī; see below) or "instead of" (nā kartā̃), and "more" (vadhu, vadhāre, etc.) or "less" (ochũ). The word for "more" is optional, while "less" is required, denoting that in the absence of either it's "more" than will be inferred.

In the absence of an object of comparison ("more" of course is now no longer optional):

Superlatives are made through comparisons with "all" (sau).

Or by leading with mā̃ "in" postpositioned to the same adjective.

Postpositions
The sparse Gujarati case system serves as a springboard for Gujarati's grammatically functional postpositions, which parallel English's prepositions. It is their use with a noun or verb that is what necessitates the noun or verb taking the oblique case. There are six, one-syllable primary postpositions. Orthographically, they are bound to the words they postposition.

નું (nũ) – genitive marker; variably declinable in the manner of an adjective. X નો(no)/નું(nũ)/ની(nī)/ના(nā)/નાં(nā̃)/ને(ne) Y has the sense "X's Y", with નો(no)/નું(nũ)/ની(nī)/ના(nā)/નાં(nā̃)/ને(ne) agreeing with Y.
એ (e) – ergative marker; applied to subjects of transitive perfective verbs.
ને (ne) – marks the indirect object (hence named  "dative marker"), or, if definite, the direct object.
થી (thī) – has a very wide range of uses and meanings:
"from";  બરોડાથી (Baroṛāthī) "from Baroda".
"from, of"; તારાથી ડરવું (tārāthī ḍarvũ) "to fear of you, to fear you".
"since"; બુધવારથી (budhvārthī) "since Wednesday".
"by, with"; instrumental marker.
"by, with, -ly"; adverbial marker.
"than"; for comparatives.
એ (e) – a general locative, specifying senses such as "at", "during", etc. It is also used adverbially. As detailed previously, for the masculine and neuter genders it is a case termination, however to marked feminine and unmarked nouns it is a postpositional addition.
પર (par) – "on".
માં (mā̃) – "in".

Postpositions can postposition other postpositions. For example, થી (thī) (as "from") suffixing the two specific locatives can help to specify what type of "from" is meant (પરથી (parthī) "from off of", માંથી (mā̃thī) "from out of").

Beyond this are a slew of compound postpositions, composed of the genitive primary postposition નું (nũ) plus an adverb.

નાં અંગે (nā aṅge) "with regard to, about"; ની અંદર (nī andar) "inside"; ની આગળ (nī āgaḷ) "in front (of)"; ની ઉપર (nī upar)  "on top (of), above"; ના કરતાં (nā kartā̃) "rather than"; ને કારણે (ne kāraṇe) "because of"; ની જોડે (nī joḍe) "with"; ની તરફ (nī taraph) "towards"; ની તરીકે (nī tarīke) "as, in the character of"; ને દરમિયાન (ne darmiyān) "during"; ની નજીક (nī najīk) "near, close to"; etc.

The genitive bit is often optionally omissible with nouns, though not with pronouns (specifically, not with first and second person genitive pronouns, because, as will be seen, they have no outward, distinct, separable નું (nũ)).

Pronouns

Personal
Gujarati has personal pronouns for the first and second persons, while its third person system uses demonstrative bases, categorized deictically as proximate and distal.

The language has a T–V distinction in તું (tũ) and તમે (tame). The latter "formal" form is also grammatically plural. A similar distinction also exists when referring to someone in the third person.

Rare among modern Indo-Aryan languages, Gujarati has inclusive and exclusive we, આપણે (āpṇe) and અમે (ame).

 તેઓ (teo) and its derivatives are quite rarely spoken and only very formally. More so it's તે લોકો (te loko) (lit. those people). The same goes for આઓ (āo) and જેઓ (jeo) and their derivatives.
 લોકો (loko) can be used to emphasize plurality elsewhere: આપણે લોકો (āpṇe loko), અમે લોકો (ame loko), તમે લોકો (tame loko).
 The initial ત (t) in distal forms is mostly dropped in speech; એ (e), એનું (ɛnũ), એમનું (ɛmnũ), etc.
 Second person formal આપ (āp) is borrowed from Hindi and might be used in rare, ultra-formal occasions (i.e. addressing a crowd).

 The system is regular for the remaining three postpositions (માં (mā̃), પર (par), થી (thī)), which suffix to an obliqued genitive base (invariably to આ (ā)): મારા (mārā), આપણા (āpṇā), અમારા (amārā), તારા (tārā), તમારા (tamārā), આના (ānā), આઓના (āonā), આમના (āmnā), તેના (tɛnā), તેઓના (teonā), તેમના (tɛmnā), જેના (jɛnā), જેઓના (jeonā), જેમના (jɛmnā), કોના (kɔnā), શેના (śɛnā). For inanimates with માં (mā̃), the genitive bit gets omitted: આમાં (āmā̃), એમાં (emā̃), જેમાં (jemā̃), શેમાં (śemā̃).
અમે (ame), અમને (amne), તમે (tame), તમને (tamne), તેણે (tɛṇe), તેમણે (tɛmṇe), તેને (tɛne), તેમને (tɛmne), જેણે (jɛṇe), જેમણે (jɛmṇe), જેને (jɛne) also occur with murmured vowels.
In speech શું(śũ) is most often not variable with regards to gender and number. It does have the oblique શે (śɛ), and although શા (śā) exists, it is rarely heard outside the phrase શા માટે (śā māṭē), meaning why (lit. for what reason).
In speech, all words  beginning with a શ (ś) are often heard as if only with a સ (s). Many speakers consider the શ (ś) to sound pedantic, however in writing, સું (śũ) and all other correspondingly spelled forms appear uneducated or rural.
In speech, all words containing an એ (ɛ) are also heard as if with and e. There would be no corresponding Gujarati spelling difference.
In speech, આપણે (āpṇe) and all other forms are often pronounced as āpre, āprũ, etc. There would be no corresponding Gujarati spelling difference.

Derivates

There is a form કયું (kayũ) which means "which?".
કેમ (kɛm)  doesn't mean "how" as would be expected; rather it means "why". It does however mean "how" in the greeting કેમ છો (kɛm cho) "how are you?". It may also mean "how" when in reference to a spoken જેમ (jɛm), તેમ (tɛm), or આમ (ām) by means of parallel structure. "How" is usually expressed in these ways: કેવી રીતે (kevī rīte) (lit. "in what kind of way"), કયી રીતે (kayī rīte) (lit. "in which way"), and કેમનું (kɛmnũ).
There are several other ways to say "now" in Gujarati: હમણાં (hamaṇā̃), અબઘડી (abghaḍī), હવે (have), and અટાણે (aṭāṇē).
અત્રે/અત્ર (atre/atra), તત્રે/તત્ર (tatre/tatra), and યત્રે/યત્ર (yatre/yatra) may also be used to mean "here", "there" and "where", although their usage is far less common than the ones above. These are Sanskrit loanwords while the above are Sanskrit descendants.
Just as in the pronouns where તે (te) becomes એ (e) colloquially, the words તેટલું (teṭlũ), તેવડું (tevṛũ), તેવું (tevũ), and તેમ (tɛm) also often lose their initial ત (t) when spoken and even written.
ક્યારે (kyāre), જ્યારે (jyāre), ત્યારે (tyāre), અત્યારે (atyāre) are composed of the adverbial locative postpostion એ (e) and the bases ક્યાર (kyār), જ્યાર (jyār), ત્યાર (tyār), અત્યાર (atyār).
People often use કેવું (kevũ) to ask about or ascertain a noun's gender. For example, બિલાડી કેવી (bilāḍī kēvī), would indicate that the noun બિલાડી (bilāḍī), "cat", is feminine.
When appending postpositions such as (માં (mā̃), થી (thī), નું (nũ), etc.), they are attached to the oblique forms ક્યાર (kyār), કેટલા (keṭlā), કેવડા (kevṛā), કેવા (kevā), etc. resulting in ક્યારથી (kyārthī), કેટલામાં (keṭlāmā̃), etc.

Verbs

Overview
The Gujarati verbal system is largely structured around a combination of aspect and tense/mood. Like the nominal system, the Gujarati verb involves successive layers of (inflectional) elements after the lexical base.

Gujarati has 2 aspects: perfective and imperfective, each having overt morphological correlates. These are participle forms, inflecting for gender, number, and case by way of a vowel termination, like adjectives. The perfective forms from the verb stem, followed by -ય(y)-, capped off by the agreement vowel and the imperfective forms with -ત(t)-.

Derived from હોવું (hɔvũ) "to be" are five copula forms: present, subjunctive, past, contrafactual (aka "past conditional"), and presumptive. Used both in basic predicative/existential sentences and as verbal auxiliaries to aspectual forms, these constitute the basis of tense and mood.

Non-aspectual forms include the infinitive, the imperative, and the agentive. Mentioned morphological conditions such the subjunctive, contrafactual, etc. are applicable to both copula roots for auxiliary usage with aspectual forms and to non-copula roots directly for often unspecified (non-aspectual) finite forms.

Finite verbal agreement is with the nominative subject, except in the transitive perfective, where it is with the direct object, with the erstwhile subject taking the ergative construction -એ(e) (see postpositions above). The perfective aspect thus displays split ergativity. The infinitive's agreement is also with its direct object, if paired with one.

Tabled just below on the left are the paradigms for the major gender and number agreement termination (GN), nominative case. Oblique paradigms differ from those introduced in #Nouns, being either thoroughly -આ(ā) or આં(ā̃). Locative -એ(e) is found in attributive adjectival function only in fixed expressions. To the right are the paradigms for the person and number agreement termination (PN), used by the subjunctive and future. Yellow fields: -એ (e) following C, ઉ (u), ઊ (ū); -ઈ (ī) following ઓ (o), ઓ (ɔ); -ય (y) following આ (ā).

Forms
The example verb is intransitive hālvũ "to shake", with various sample inflections.

Notes
The negation particles are na and nahi with the former standing before the copula (or if no copula, the aspectual form) and the latter generally after. A negation particle combines with present ch-PN however for the invariable nathī. An alternative to the past na hat-GN is nahot-GN.
{|class="wikitable" style="text-align:center"
! Aff
|ch-PN
|hɔ-PN
|ha-t-GN
|hɔ-t
|ha-(ī)ś-PN
|
|-
! Neg
|nathī
|na hɔ-PN
|na ha-t-GN
|na hɔ-t
|ha-(ī)ś-PN nahi
|na, nahi
|}
Gujarati retains an aspectually unmarked form (*-PN) in the function of the Present Imperfective, although a marked form replaces it in the negative.
Gujarati does not distinguish between habitual and continuous.
When GN = ī then y is omitted. hālyo, but hālī.
Some roots show vowel alternation:
ā/a : jā/ja "go", thā/tha "become, occur".
e/ɛ/a/ø : le/lɛ/la/l "take", de/dɛ/da/d "give".
o/u : jo/ju "see, look, watch", dho/dhu "wash".
ɔ/a/ø : hɔ/ha/h "be".
In northern and central Gujarat, roots in -ā regularly have -a- before -īś- of future forms.
Certain verb forms show suppletion in their perfective roots: ga- (jā "go"), kī- (kar "do" [in some dialects]), dī- (jo "see, look, watch" [in some dialects]).
Instead of the general affix -y- in their perfectives a few vowel-terminating roots take dh and s-terminating roots ṭh.
dh : khā-dh- (khā "eat"), dī-dh- (de "give"), pī-dh- (pī "drink"), lī-dh- (le "take"), bī-dh- (bī "fear"), kī-dh- (kahe "say" [in addition to kah-y-]), kī-dh- (kar "do" [in addition to kar-y-]).
ṭh : nā-ṭh- (nās "flee"), pɛ-ṭh- (pɛs "enter"), bɛ-ṭh- (bɛs "sit"), dī-ṭh- (jo "see, look, watch" [in addition to jo-y-]).
t : sū-t- (sū "sleep").
The ha in the past auxiliary ha-t-GN is omitted in speech after aspectual forms and negative na.
Flexible order: hālto nathī ←→ nathī hālto.
The future imperative is politer than the imperative, and using the future tense (questioningly: "will you...?") is politer still.

Causatives
Gujarati causatives are morphologically contrastive. Verbs can be causativized up to two times, to a double causative.

Single
Causatives are made by two main schemes involving alteration of the root.

Lengthening of final vowel; shortening of a preceding vowel (if ū is the only vowel, then → o).
Final ṭ → ḍ.
or
Suffix v if ending in vowel or h.
Shortening of vowel(s).
Suffix: āv, āḍ, v, vḍāv, or eḍ.
Sometimes nasalisation (anusvāra).

If the causativization is of a transitive, then the secondary agent, whom the subject "causes to" or "gets to" do whatever, is marked by the postposition nī pāse.

Double
Furthermore, that causative can be causativized again, for a double causative ("to cause to cause... "), with a possible tertiary agent.

ḍāv suffixed to 1st causative suffix of āv.
āv suffixed to 1st causative suffixes of āḍ and eḍ.
Beyond this are irregular forms that must be memorized.

Passives
The passive has both periphrastic and morphological means of expression. The former has -mā̃ āvvũ postpositioned to infinitive; the latter has ā added to root, with certain phonological processes as work as well: if the root vowel is ā then it becomes a (See Gujarati phonology#ɑ-reduction) and if the root ends in a vowel then h or v is suffixed. Thus lakhvũ "to write" → lakhvāmā āvvũ, lakhāvũ "to be written". The post-position thī marks the agent, As in other New Indo-Aryan languages, formation of passives is not restricted to transitive verbs and has a restricted domain of usage except in special registers. Both intransitive and transitive may be grammatically passivized to show capacity, in place of compounding with the modal śakvũ "to be able". Lastly, intransitives often have a passive sense, or convey unintentional action.

Sample text

References

Bibliography
.
.
.
.
.
.
.
.
.

Gujarati language
Indo-Aryan grammars